Wilhelm Jacoby (1855-1925) was a German playwright, who concentrated largely on creating farces notably the 1890 work Pension Schöller which he co-authored with Carl Laufs. He was the father of the film director George Jacoby, who adapted Pension Schöller into film on three occasions.

Selected works
 The Duchess of Athens (1883)
 Pension Schöller (1890)

Bibliography
 Grange, William. Historical Dictionary of German Theater. Scarecrow Press, 2006.

1855 births
1925 deaths

Writers from Mainz
People from Rhenish Hesse
German male writers